The 2023 North Dakota State Bison baseball team represents North Dakota State University during the 2023 NCAA Division I baseball season. The Bison play their home games at Newman Outdoor Field adjacent to NDSU's campus. The team is coached by second year head coach Tyler Oakes.

Previous season
The Bison finished last season with a 31-19 overall record, and a 17-5 record in the Summit League good for the team's first Summit League Regular Season title. Their conference record was also the program's best since entering the conference. In the Summit League tournament, the Bison opened as the number 1 seed. They lost to Omaha in the opening round, then beat South Dakota State to advance to the elimination round semifinals. However, the Bison fell to Omaha yet again to end their chances of defending their conference title from the previous season.

Personnel

Roster

Coaching staff

Schedule and results

References

North Dakota State
North Dakota State Bison baseball seasons
2023 in sports in North Dakota